Bagheera is a genus of jumping spiders within the family Salticidae, subfamily Salticinae and subtribe Dendryphantina. The genus was first described by George Peckham & Elizabeth Peckham in 1896. The name is derived from Bagheera, a character from Rudyard Kipling's Jungle Book.

The type species Bagheera kiplingi is noted for its unique, primarily herbivorous diet of Beltian bodies. Male individuals within the genus may be identified by their elongate, horizontal, parallel chelicerae.

Species
 it contains four species, found in Guatemala, Costa Rica, the United States, and Mexico:

Bagheera kiplingi (Peckham & Peckham, 1896) (type) – Mexico to Costa Rica
Bagheera laselva (Ruiz & Edwards, 2013) – Costa Rica
Bagheera motagua (Ruiz & Edwards, 2013) – Guatemala
Bagheera prosper (Peckham & Peckham, 1901) – USA, Mexico

References

External links
Recent photographs of Bagheera

Salticidae genera
Salticidae
Spiders of Central America
Spiders of North America